Oakley is an unincorporated community in Butler Township, Miami County, in the U.S. state of Indiana.

Geography

References

Unincorporated communities in Miami County, Indiana
Unincorporated communities in Indiana